The Kyungsung FC–Pyongyang FC rivalry, commonly known as the Kyung-Pyong Football Series, was a football rivalry in the early 20th century between Seoul (called Gyeongseong/Kyungsung or Keijō at the time) and Pyongyang which are currently capital of South Korea and North Korea. The clash between Korea's two biggest cities was considered as the biggest rivalry in Korea. Seoul and Pyongyang developed historical rivalry for over a century, and their football teams were no exception.

History
In the Joseon era of Korea, Hanyang (currently Seoul) was the capital, and Pyongyang was the second largest city. By the way, Joseon government created the discriminative atmosphere against Pyongan Province including Pyongyang, and there was also profound conflict between the two largest cities. They developed a rivalry due to Korean historical backgrounds.

Many football clubs and school teams were made in 1910s in Korea along the booming of football, and the All Joseon Football Tournament (predecessor of the Korean FA Cup) was held in 1921.

The first Kyung-Pyong Football Series was held by the Chosun Ilbo in Seoul in 1929, and the united team in each city participated. It was so popular as most of the shops closed at the match days. However, the series was often stopped because of the riot between excited fans, and at last it was all folded after 1930. In 1933, Pyongyang FC and Kyungsung FC were officially founded, and the annual series was reopened. After 1936, however, it was substituted by other cup matches which many clubs from other cities joined. Despite of the end of the series, the two clubs occasionally met each other in several competitions until the division of South and North Korea.

Series

Other matches

Statistics

See also
 Kyungsung FC
 Pyongyang FC
 All Joseon Football Tournament
 North Korea–South Korea football rivalry

References

Further reading
 大韓蹴球協會 편 『韓國蹴球百年史』라사라, 1986.
 윤경헌, 최창신『축구 = 1 : 國技축구 그 찬란한 아침 』국민체육진흥공단, 1997.

External links

Football Championship
Football Championship
Football rivalries in South Korea
Football in Seoul
Football in Pyongyang
Kyungsung FC
Pyongyang FC
1929 establishments in Korea